Heertje is a surname that can refer to the following people:

 Arnold Heertje, a Dutch economist, writer and columnist
 Raoul Heertje, a Dutch comedian and son of Arnold Heertje